Vero Beach Regional Airport  is a public airport one mile northwest of Vero Beach in Indian River County, Florida, United States. The airport is publicly owned and is the home of Piper Aircraft.

History

1929–1941
In 1929, Bud Holman, whose sons and grandsons now operate Sun Aviation, was one of the group that built the airport in Vero Beach. The Vero Beach Regional Airport was dedicated in 1930 and in 1932 Eastern Air Lines began refueling there. In 1935 EAL started passenger and mail service from Vero Beach, making Vero Beach the smallest little airport in Florida to have airmail service, continuing until about January 1973. By the end of the 1930s the airport got runway lights and radio and teletype machines; in 1939, using Public Assistance workers, the runways were extended and a year later the Civil Aviation Administration spent $250,000 on more improvements.

NAS Vero Beach
In 1942 the U.S. Navy notified Vero Beach that it had selected its airport for a naval air station and purchased  surrounding the airport. The base was commissioned as Naval Air Station Vero Beach in 1942 and initially functioned as an operational training unit training for Naval Aviators beginning in February 1943 with the SB2A Buccaneer aircraft.

In December 1944 the mission of NAS Vero Beach changed to night fighter training using F6F Hellcats and F7F Tigercats. Witham Field in Stuart was designated as Naval Auxiliary Air Station Witham Field and was a subordinate base of NAS Vero Beach.  Airfields at Sebastian/Roseland (OLF Roseland) and Fort Pierce (OLF Fort Pierce) also served as outlying landing fields. Air-sea rescue of downed pilots was provided from Fort Pierce.  Over 237,100 hours of flight time occurred between 1942 and the base closing in 1946. Base personnel were quartered in the Beachland Hotel, The Sebastian Inn, and other facilities in the community.  At its peak NAS Vero Beach was home to 250 aircraft and 1,400 U.S. Navy and U.S. Marine Corps personnel, to include Navy WAVES and Woman Marines. After the war, the installation was reduced to a skeletal staff and in 1947 the Navy closed NAS Vero Beach and returned it to the city for use again as a civil airport.

Postwar
In 1948 Major League Baseball arrived as Bud Holman, a local businessman, invited the Brooklyn Dodgers to take over barracks facilities from the closed naval air station for winter and spring training. The Dodgers liked the area so much that Dodgertown was born, a  tract next to the airport, as their training grounds. The Dodgers continued to use the facility even after becoming the Los Angeles Dodgers until they moved to a new facility in Glendale, Arizona in 2008.

In 1957 Piper Aircraft selected Vero Beach for a research and development center at the former naval air station; in 1961 Piper moved administrative and manufacturing operations here. Manufacturing of Piper Aircraft at the Vero Beach facility ceased in the mid-1980s when increasing product liability insurance premiums made continued operation financially impossible. Upon limitation of liability by new legislation by United States Congress in the early 1990s, manufacturing began again in 1995.

FlightSafety Academy, a leading flight training school and part of FlightSafety International, is also at Vero Beach Regional Airport. The facility's focus is on ab initio flight training for prospective U.S. and international commercial airline pilots who are not graduates of a military flight training program.

Today, Vero Beach Regional Airport is a  tower-controlled facility with an FAR Part 139 operating certificate. The airport has seen airlines (mainly regional) in the past, commercial passenger service continued, including USAir Express flights to Melbourne and Orlando in the 1990s, but the American Eagle flew its last flight to Miami in February 1996 — ending Vero Beach's commercial passenger service for nearly two decades. Elite Airways began operating flights from the airport in 2015 but stopped indefinitely in 2022.

It currently has scheduled non-stop service on Breeze Airways to Hartford and White Plains, and direct service to Norfolk, which began on February 3, 2023. Vero Beach is one of the few commercial airports in the United States to offer free long-term parking for up to 21 days.

Airlines and destinations

References

External links

 

1930 establishments in Florida
Airports in Florida
Airports established in 1930
Buildings and structures in Vero Beach, Florida
Transportation buildings and structures in Indian River County, Florida
Transportation in Vero Beach, Florida